Blancocamelus is an extinct genus of terrestrial herbivores the family Camelidae, endemic to North America during the Pliocene through Pleistocene—4.9 million years ago until 300,000 years ago, existing for about 4.6 million years.

Taxonomy
Blancocamelus was named by Dalquest (1975). Its type species is Blancocamelus meadei. It was assigned to the Camelidae by Dalquest (1975) and Carroll (1988).

References

Prehistoric camelids
Prehistoric even-toed ungulate genera
Pliocene even-toed ungulates
Pleistocene even-toed ungulates
Extant Pliocene first appearances
Pleistocene genus extinctions
Prehistoric mammals of North America